Eliane Valdez Sarmientos (born 19 July 2001) is a Cuban footballer who plays as a forward for the Cuba women's national team.

International career
Valdez represented Cuba at the 2020 CONCACAF Women's U-20 Championship. She capped at senior level during the 2022 CONCACAF W Championship qualification.

References

2001 births
Living people
Cuban women's footballers
Women's association football forwards
Cuba women's international footballers
21st-century Cuban women